Polkton can refer to:
 Polkton Township, Michigan
 Polkton, North Carolina